Christine Odell Cook Miller (born August 26, 1944) is a former judge of the United States Court of Federal Claims from 1982 to 2013.

Born in Oakland, California, Miller received a Bachelor of Science from Stanford University in 1966 and a Juris Doctor from the University of Utah College of Law in 1969, where she was a Comment Editor for the Utah Law Review and a member of the Utah Chapter of the Order of the Coif. She was a law clerk to the Hon. David T. Lewis of the United States Court of Appeals for the Tenth Circuit from 1969 to 1970, and was thereafter a trial attorney in the Civil Division of the U.S. Department of Justice from 1970 to 1972, and in the Bureau of Consumer Protection of the Federal Trade Commission from 1972 to 1974. In 1976, Miller entered private practice with the litigation section of Hogan and Hartson, in Washington, D.C. She then served as special counsel to the Pension Benefit Guaranty Corporation from 1976 to 1978 and as assistant general counsel to the U.S. Railway Association from 1978 to 1980, returning to litigation practice from 1980 to 1982 with Shack and Kimball P.C.

Federal judicial service
On November 29, 1982, Miller was nominated by President Ronald Reagan to a fifteen-year term on the U.S. Claims Court in a seat vacated by David Schwartz. She was confirmed by the United States Senate on December 10, 1982, and received her commission on December 10, 1982. At the time of her confirmation, she was confirmed under the name, Christine Cook Nettesheim. She was thereafter nominated for reappointment to the same position by President Bill Clinton on November 6, 1997, and in the interim was reappointed by a recess appointment from Clinton on December 10, 1997. Her reappointment was formally confirmed by the Senate on February 3, 1998, and she received commission on February 4, 1998. Miller assumed senior status on February 4, 2013, and then retired completely from the court on March 1, 2013.

Miller was married to Dennis F. Miller, but served from her appointment until September 10, 1994, under the name Christine Cook Nettesheim.

References

External links 

1944 births
Living people
20th-century American judges
20th-century American women judges
21st-century American judges
21st-century American women judges
Judges of the United States Court of Federal Claims
People from Oakland, California
S.J. Quinney College of Law alumni
Stanford University alumni
United States Article I federal judges appointed by Ronald Reagan